Maurizio Rasero (born 30 October 1973 in Asti) is an Italian politician. He is member of the centre-right party Forza Italia.

He has been a young member of Forza Italia since he was a member of the municipal council of Asti elected in 2002. Rasero ran for Mayor of Asti at the 2017 local elections, supported by a centre-right coalition, and he was elected on 27 June 2017.

See also
 2017 Italian local elections
 List of mayors of Asti

References

External links 
 

Living people
1973 births
People from Asti
Forza Italia politicians
21st-century Italian politicians
Mayors of Asti